Roberto Rino Magliola (born 1940) is an Italian-American academic specializing in European hermeneutics and deconstruction, comparative philosophy, and inter-religious dialogue. He is retired from National Taiwan University and Assumption University of Thailand.

Career 
Robert Magliola received his doctorate in 1970 from Princeton University in comparative literature with a specialty and dissertation in phenomenology/hermeneutics. He retired from the (interfaith) Graduate School of Philosophy and Religions, Abac Assumption University (Thailand), where he was a professor of philosophy and religious studies, and from National Taiwan University, where he was a distinguished chair professor in the Graduate School of Liberal Arts. In 1983–84, he taught and researched at Tamkang University in Taiwan while on sabbatical from Purdue University, where he had taught since 1969 and been a professor since 1981.

In 1985, he moved to the Orient. He continued publication in Buddhism and deconstruction and did interdisciplinary writing and conferencing on postmodernism (in literature and Religious Studies) throughout this period. A Carmelite lay tertiary (1982–present), he began to write more extensively both on the application of Derridean thought motifs to Catholic theology and on Catholic meditation (see Christian Meditation and see Contemplation), making an invited presentation in 1999 on 'Catholic Meditation in Tibetan Vajrayana Form' for the Pontifical Council for Culture and the Federation of Asian Bishops Councils.

In Thailand, he researched Theravada Buddhism and trained in Vipassanā-Satipatthana meditation (Wat Mahathat, Bangkok) in 1994. He organized and chaired the Thai delegation of Buddhist and Catholic scholars from Assumption University to the quadrennial international meetings of the Society for Buddhist-Christian Studies (1996, 2000), having begun presenting papers there in 1992. After a return to teaching in Taiwan for two years, he retired from university teaching in 2002. He lives in the United States of America. Since 2002, he has taught minicourses, organized forums, and been an interfaith retreatant at the Manhattan (NYC) Center of the Wu Sheng Monastery, Ling Jiou Shan Buddhist Society, Kung-Liao, Taiwan (2002–2005) [the Manhattan Center closed in 2005 and moved to Oakland Garden, Queens, NYC]. In the spring 2012, Ling Jiou Shan opened a new Center in Flushing, NYC, enabling Magliola to resume his affiliation as an interfaith retreatant and consultant (2012-2019).

From 2002 to 2007, he has been a co-editor for volumes in the book series "Seminars on Culture and Values" for the Council for Research in Values and Philosophy, the Catholic University of America, Washington, D.C. He is a co-editor (2008–  ) of the DES Journal (3 issues a year; c. 20,000 circulation), the academic journal of Delta Epsilon Sigma, a national scholastic honor society for students, faculty and alumni of Catholic colleges and universities. He was a Seminar Associate (2002–2011) of the Seminar in Buddhist Studies (a faculty and graduate student forum) at Columbia University and studied (autumn 2010–summer 2012) the meditative mode of Ajaan Lee Dhammadharo as it is taught at the Downtown New York Meditation Community (Manhattan, N.Y.C.) (vipassanā). In Italy — as of spring 2012 — Magliola practices at Villa Vangelo e Zen ("The Gospel and Zen"), Desio (Lombardia). On March 27, 2013, Magliola received an official Attestato (Certification) from Vangelo e Zen: the document declares that he is qualified to teach meditation "as transmitted in Zen, and in other Oriental forms" [in which he has been trained] to "priests, Religious, and laity of the Catholic Church," in accordance with "the spirituality of dialogue promoted by Vatican Council II."

In 2012 and 2013, Magliola was a Reviewer/Outside Reader in Buddhism and Postmodern Theology for Harvard Theological Review, Harvard University.

Jacques Derrida and Buddhism
Magliola is a specialist in European hermeneutics and deconstruction, in comparative philosophy, and in Buddhist – (Roman) Catholic dialogue. He was the first scholar to have identified and published at length (Derrida on the Mend, 1984) on possible intersections between Jacques Derrida's thought and Buddhism, especially Madhyamika Buddhism and its generally accepted "founder," Nagarjuna:

 "As far as I know, Magliola is the first person to study Derrida in a Buddhist perspective, and he does this with a higher degree of speculative engagement than has been attained in similar studies of Nietzsche, Wittgenstein, and Bergson." – Joseph S. O'Leary,in his review of Derrida on the Mend in Japanese Journal of Religious Studies, Vol. 12, No. 4, p. 362.
 "The latter [Magliola's On Deconstructing Life-Worlds: Buddhism, Christianity, Culture, 1997] is a major work from an author whose earlier book, Derrida on the Mend, was the first to cross Buddhism and deconstruction." – N. Robert Glass.
 "Since Robert Magliola's 1984 publication Derrida on the Mend, which involved his pioneering comparison of Derrida and Nagarjuna, ..." – Youru Wang, in his review of Youxuan Wang, Buddhism and Deconstruction: Towards a Comparative Semiotics, in Philosophy East and West, Vol. 55, No. 3 (July 2005)
 "It took Magliola, in Derrida on the Mend, to bring Nagarjuna and other Buddhist voices into the arena of the discourse on deconstruction, and the efforts of the academy to marginalize his work have been considerable." – E. H. Jarow, "Zen Flesh, Bones, and Blood: Deconstructing Inter-Religious Dialogue," in Buddhisms and Deconstructions, ed. J.Y. Park, p. 228.

For other references to Derrida on the Mend making a similar point, see Harold Coward (Derrida and Indian Philosophy, State U. of New York Press, 1990, p. 125), Dennis McCort (Journal of the American Academy of Religion, Vol. 71, No. 1 (2003), p. 225), and Ellen Y. Zhang ("Jizang's Śūnyatā-Speech: A Derridean Dénégation with Buddhist Negations," in Buddhisms and Deconstructions, ed. Park, p. 116).
 
Brian Bocking and Youxuan Wang state, in their "Signs of Liberation?—A Semiotic Approach to Wisdom in Chinese Madhyamika Buddhism," The Journal of Chinese Philosophy, Vol. 33, No. 3 (Sept. 2006), that Derrida on the Mend also works with the Chan/Zen form of Buddhism, pioneering the comparison of this Far Eastern tradition and several Western semiotic themes:  "As early as 1984, certain semiotic themes in Chinese Chan Buddhism were picked up in Robert Magliola, Derrida on the Mend,. ... "

Bibliography

Books

 Phenomenology and Literature (Purdue University Press, 1977, 2nd printing 1978), 208 pp.
 Derrida on the Mend (Purdue University Press, 1984; 2nd edition, 1986), 238 pp. Reprint, Purdue University Press, 2000–2011, 2013-.
 On Deconstructing Life-Worlds: Buddhism, Christianity, Culture''' (Scholars Press, American Academy of Religion, 1997; Oxford University Press, 2000- ), 202 pp.
 Facing Up to Real Doctrinal Difference: How Some Thought-Motifs From Derrida Can Nourish the Catholic-Buddhist Encounter (Angelico Press, 2014), 224 pp.

Articles
 "Two Models of Trinity—French Post-Structuralist versus the Historical-Critical: Argued in the Form of a Dialogue," in O. Blanchette, T. Imamich, and G. F. McLean, eds., Philosophical Challenges and Opportunities of Globalization, Cultural Heritage and Contemporary Change: Series I, 'Culture and Values', Vol. 19.2 (Washington, D.C.: Council for Research in Values and Philosophy [CRVP], 2001), pp. 401–425.
 "After-word" (essay discussing the collected papers) in Jin Y. Park, ed., with After-word by Robert Magliola, in Buddhisms and Deconstructions (Rowman and Littlefield, 2006), pp. 235–270
 "Hongzhou Chan Buddhism, and Derrida Late and Early: Justice, Ethics, and Karma," in Youru Wang, ed., Deconstruction and the Ethical in Asian Thought (Routledge Press, 2007), pp. 175–191.
 "Transformation Theory and Postcolonial Discourse: Jung by Lacan by Derrida (Bar Sinister Descent)," in R. Lumsden and R. Patke, Institutions in Cultures: Theory and Practice (Rodopi, 1996), pp. 239–260.
 "Sexual Rogations and Mystical Abrogations: Some Données of Buddhist Tantra and the Catholic Renaissance," in C. Koelb and S. Noakes, The Comparative Perspective on Literature (Cornell University Press, 1988), pp. 195–212.
 "Appropriative and/or Imitative Use(s): Some Cruxes—Greek, Latin, English, French, Sanskrit," in Han-Liang Chang, ed., Concepts of Literary Theory East and West (Taipei: Bookman Books and Chinese Comparative Lit. Assoc., 1993), pp. 183–244.
 "Differential Theology and Womankind: On Isaiah 66:13," in P. Berry and A.Wernick, eds., Shadow of Spirit: Postmodernism and Religion (Routledge, 1992), pp. 211–225

References

Further reading

  Jaime M. Rivera, S.J., From Peripheries to Center to Peripheries: An Exposition and Evaluation of Robert Magliola on Buddhist-Catholic Dialogue, Thesis in Theological Studies, 429 pp., Faculty of Theology and Ministry, Ateneo de Manila University, Quezon City, The Philippines, May 2016.
 Jane Augustine, "The Veil Rent in Twain: A Buddhist Reading of Robert Magliola's Deconstructive Chiasm", in J. Y. Park, ed., with "After-word" by R. Magliola, Buddhisms and Deconstructions (Rowman & Littlefield, 2006), pp. 171–182.
 Gad Horowitz, "emmanuel, robert", in Buddhisms and Deconstructions'', pp. 183–190.
 Robert Magliola, "After-word," in "Buddhisms and Deconstructions", pp. 253–260. Magliola's carefully deliberated assessment of the arguments in Augustine and Horowitz (see their essays above) which controvert his world-view.

See also
 Jacques Derrida
 J. Hillis Miller
 East Asian Mādhyamaka
 Postmodernism
 Postmodern literature  
 Lay theologian 
 American philosophy
 List of American philosophers
 List of Italian Americans
 Deconstruction
 Continental philosophers
 Existential philosophy

1940 births
Living people
Princeton University alumni
American philosophers
Catholic philosophers
American scholars of Buddhism
Buddhist writers
Christian continental philosophers and theologians
Deconstruction
Religion academics
Lay theologians
Comparative literature academics
American literary critics
Hermeneutists
American expatriates in Taiwan
American expatriates in Thailand